Michael Jørn Berg (born May 29, 1955) is a former Danish handball player who competed in the 1980 Summer Olympics.

He was born in Hørsholm.

In 1980 he finished ninth with the Danish team in the Olympic tournament. He played all six matches and scored 16 goals.

External links
profile

1955 births
Living people
People from Hørsholm Municipality
Danish male handball players
Olympic handball players of Denmark
Handball players at the 1980 Summer Olympics
Sportspeople from the Capital Region of Denmark